Anura Horatious is a popular Sri Lankan author of crime fiction, best known for the bestselling novel Gini Avi Saha Gini Keli ((Firearms and Fireworks). The novel was later adapted into an award-winning film by Udayakantha Warnasuriya in 1998. In 2003, he directed his first film, Sonduru Dadabima (A Pleasurable Hunt).

References

Year of birth missing (living people)
Living people
Sri Lankan novelists
Crime fiction writers